Wild on the Beach is a 1965 beach party film directed by Maury Dexter and starring Frankie Randall, Sherry Jackson, Gayle Caldwell, and Jackie Miller. It is notable for the musical acts showcased onscreen, being the film debut of Sonny & Cher in particular. It is one of the few films in the genre to be filmed in black and white.

Although some sources state that the film was also released under the title Beach House Party,  to date no prints or posters have surfaced with such a title.

Plot
Co-ed Lee Sullivan (Sherry Jackson), a student at an unnamed California college, inherits a house on the beach from her late uncle. She wants to use the building as a boarding house for girls, thus both alleviating the student housing shortage and financing her education.

Meanwhile, Adam Miller (Frankie Randall) plans to turn the beach house into a boys' boardinghouse, claiming that he received permission to do so while Lee's uncle was still alive. Adam secretly files first for an off-campus housing permit, and the boys take up residence in the house. Lee also receives a permit, and naturally, problems develop when both male and female students decide to co-habitate – this administrative mix-up also makes for much ducking and dodging of the university authorities.

In spite of being at odds with each other, a romance blossoms between Lee and Adam.

Cast
 Frankie Randall as Adam Miller
 Sherry Jackson as Lee Sullivan
 Gayle Caldwell as Marsie Lowell
 Jackie Miller as Toby Carr
 Russ Bender as Shep Kirby
 Booth Colman as Dean Parker
 Cindy Malone as herself
 Justin Smith as Mort Terwilliger
 Jerry Grayson as Vern Thompkins
 Marc Seaton as Jim Bench
 Robert Golden as Policeman
 Larry Gust as Josh
 Sonny & Cher as themselves
 The Astronauts as themselves

Production notes
After making 1963's The Young Swingers and 1964's Surf Party, this was director/producer Maury Dexter's third teen flick – and second effort to imitate AIP's Beach Party formula. AIP would later hire Dexter to direct Maryjane and The Mini-Skirt Mob.

Dexter has said that casting Sonny and Cher was the idea of Fred Roos.

While promoted as a standard beach party film with posters showing most of the female stars in bikinis and a title song with the lyrics "...only two steps down to the nearest wave, and surf's up every night!", no one in the cast actually wears swimsuits in the film, nor do any of them do anything on the beach – except walk on it – fully clothed. In fact, Frankie Randall, the male lead, wears a windbreaker on top of his shirt for most of the film.

Although little surfing is shown in the film apart from a few random insert shots of extras on surfboards, the "surfing coordinator" for Wild on the Beach was Phil Sauer, who had also worked on AIP's Muscle Beach Party and Bikini Beach (both 1964); Beach Blanket Bingo and How to Stuff a Wild Bikini (both 1965); as well as Columbia's Ride the Wild Surf (1964).

This was also the second time Dexter used the Boulder, Colorado-based surf band The Astronauts.

Music
 Jimmie Haskell composed the score and co-wrote two songs; associate producer "By" Dunham received a writing credit for six songs in the film.
 Frankie Randall performs two songs, "The House on the Beach" and "The Gods of Love" (both written by Bobby Beverly and By Dunham).
 The Astronauts perform four songs in the film: the rockabilly "Rock This World" (written by Beverly and Dunham), and the three surf tunes "Little Speedy Gonzalez" (written by Stan Ross and Beverly), "Pyramid Stomp" (written by  Haskell and Dunham), and "Snap It" (written by Haskell)
 Sonny & Cher (backed by The Astronauts) sing "It's Gonna Rain" (written by Sonny Bono), and Jackie & Gayle sing "Winter Nocturne" (written by Eddie Davis and Dunham).
 Cindy Malone sings "Run Away from Him" (written by Beverly and Dunham); Russ Bender sings the country & western song "Yellow Haired Woman" (written by Eddie Davis and Dunham); and Sandy Nelson performs "Drum Dance" (written by Joe Saraceno and Frank Warren).

Critical response
"The third (and last) of Maury Dexter's Beach Party rip-offs, Wild on the Beach is so third-rate and low-budget that an unintentional sense of 'realism' creeps into it."

See also
List of American films of 1965

References

External links
 
 
 
 
 The Video Beat
 The New York Times

1965 films
1960s teen films
20th Century Fox films
American black-and-white films
American teen films
Beach party films
Films directed by Maury Dexter
Films scored by Jimmie Haskell
Films set in California
1960s English-language films
1960s American films